The National Autonomous University of Nicaragua at León (UNAN-León) is a state-funded public university of Nicaragua. UNAN-León is the oldest university in the country, established in 1812.

History
UNAN-León has its roots in the Tridentine Seminary College of Saint Raymond, established in the city of León in 1680. In 1812, UNAN-León became the second university in Central America and the last one established during the end of the Spanish colony on the continent of America.

By government decree in 1983, the campus of the National Autonomous University of Nicaragua in León and Managua, became two separate entities: UNAN and UNAN-León.

Gallery

See also 
Education in Nicaragua
List of universities in Nicaragua
 List of colonial universities in Latin America

External links
 UNAN-León Website

References

UNAN-Leon
1680 establishments in the Spanish Empire

León, Nicaragua